Black Out the Sun may refer to:

 Black Out the Sun (album), or the title track, by Sevendust, 2013
 "Black Out the Sun" (song), by Darren Hayes, 2011
 Black Out the Sun, a 2006 EP by Radford

See also
 Black Out the Sun Tour, a 2016–2017 concert tour by the Zac Brown Band